Leptoreodon is an extinct genus of small Artiodactyla, of the family Protoceratidae, endemic to North America. Leptoreodon resembled deer, but were more closely related to camelids.

Fossil distribution
Fossils have been recovered from: 
Devil's Graveyard Formation, Brewster County, Texas 
Webb County, Texas
Swift Current Creek, Cypress Hills Formation, Saskatchewan

References

 
Priabonian genus extinctions
Eocene even-toed ungulates
Eocene mammals of North America
Fossil taxa described in 1898
Prehistoric even-toed ungulate genera